Electric Music was the second album by Karl Bartos' "Elektric Music" project, recorded after his collaboration with UK band Electronic on their 1996 album Raise the Pressure and released in 1998. The entire album was written by Bartos and was, according to his website, an "exploration of the sound of the sixties — guitar pop out of the computer!"

Reception

Track listing

Personnel 
 Karl Bartos – Vocals, keyboards, guitars, production
 Markus Löhr – Keyboards, guitars, production
 Stefan Ingmann – Mix
 Guido Apke – Engineer
 Rüdiger Nehmzow  – Cover art

References

1998 albums
East West Records albums
Karl Bartos albums